The Armenians in Abkhazia form the second largest ethnic group in Abkhazia after the native Abkhazians. Armenians settled in Abkhazia in late 19th and the early 20th centuries and are now the largest ethnic group in Sukhumi, Gulripsh and Gagra Districts forming 20% of the Abkhazian population with approximately 42,000 out of a total of 242,862.

History
Although a few Armenians lived in Abkhazia in the Middle Ages, significant Armenian immigration to Abkhazia began in the late 19th century when much of Abkhazia became depopulated due to the exodus of many Abkhaz of Muslim descent to the Ottoman Empire after the Russian crackdown on the rebellion in Abkhazia; at the same time anti-Armenian pogroms started in Turkey and the attitude of the Porte towards its Armenian subjects became increasingly more brutal. More Armenians came to Abkhazia in 1910s fleeing the Armenian genocide.

During the 1992–1993 War in Abkhazia most of the Armenians remained neutral for a long time, but as Georgian attacks on their settlements increased, they increasingly opted to support Abkhazians and many fought on their side. Armenians made up a quarter of the Abkhaz army; twenty Armenians were awarded the title of Abkhazian Hero and 242 were killed in battle. Armenian population declined after the war as many Armenians left the country (mainly for Russia and Armenia) due to the economic hardships. Armenians have become the largest ethnic group in Sukhumi, Gulripshi and Gagra Districts following the displacement of ethnic Georgians from these areas.

Demography
The earliest reliable records for Abkhazia are the Family Lists compiled in 1886 (published 1893 in Tbilisi), according to which the Sukhum District's population was 69,000 of which 28,000 were Abkhaz. The Armenians in that list totalled 1,090.

According to the 1897 census there were 58,697 people in Abkhazia who listed Abkhaz as their mother tongue. There were about 1,500 Armenians in the Sukhumi district (Abkhazia) at that time; its total population was nearly 100,000.

Armenians in Abkhazia by districts in 2003

The Russian, Armenian and Georgian population grew faster than Abkhaz, due to the large-scale migration enforced especially during the rule of Joseph Stalin and Lavrentiy Beria.

The following table summarises the results of the other censuses carried out in Abkhazia.

 The Georgian authorities did not acknowledge the results of this census and consider it illegitimate. At the same time, the Abkhaz authorities have been accused by local Armenian NGOs of intentionally decreasing the number of Abkhazian-Armenians.

Religion
Armenian Apostolic Church gives ecclesiastical guidance to most of the Armenians.

Politics
There are ethnic Armenians in the People's Assembly of Abkhazia and Armenian-language schools in Abkhazia. However, Armenians are under-represented in the Assembly as the number of the parliamentarians of this ethnicity is less than their share in the republic population. The Council of Armenian Community of Abkhazia has complained over "negative attitude to Armenian population" and has expressed concerns over the distribution of anti-Armenian leaflets, as well as an attempt of sabotage at a Sukhumi Armenian secondary school in 2006.

In 2007, the Georgian media began running several stories on the parliamentary elections in Abkhazia, claiming that ethnic Armenians in the area, who make up roughly 20% of the local population, would be controlling the elections.

Further reading
 V.A. Chirikba: Armenians and their dialects in Abkhazia, in: Studies in Slavic and General Linguistics, Vol. 33 (2008), pp. 51–67.

See also
Bagramyan Battalion

References

Armenian diaspora in Asia
Armenian diaspora in Europe
Armenian diaspora in Georgia (country)
Hemshin people
Ethnic groups in Abkhazia